Andy de Jarlis (19141975) was a Canadian Métis fiddler from Woodridge, Manitoba.  He was credited with more than 200 musical compositions. He played on Winnipeg radio accompanied by the musical group the Red River Mates. He moved to Vancouver and later to Montreal, where he appeared on the television program Don Messer's Jubilee as Andy Dejarlis and His Early Settlers.

Biography
De Jarlis was born Andrew Joseph Patrice Ephreme Desjarlais on 29 September 1914, in Woodridge, Manitoba, to father Pierre. He came from a family of Métis fiddlers and began playing at age 15. Pierre Falcon, often called the "Red River Bard", was one of his ancestors. He was known to have scored more than 200 musical compositions "to his credit (jigs, reels, polkas and waltzes) as well as 38 records." He played on Winnipeg radio accompanied by the musical group the Red River Mates. He moved to Vancouver and later to Montreal where he appeared on the television program Don Messer's Jubilee as Andy Dejarlis and His Early Settlers.

De Jarlis died 18 September 1975 in Saint Boniface, Manitoba, Canada.

Discography
 The Manitoba Golden Boy
 Red River Echoes
 Red River Echoes, Vol. 2
 Square Dance with Andy Dejarlis
 Andy Dejarlis and His Early Settlers
 Old Time Waltzes
 Let's Do The Two-steps
 Andy Dejarlis's Favourite Old Time Tunes
 Jolly Old Time Music with Andy Dejarlis
 
  (Chain the men - chain the women)
 
 Original Old-Time Music
 Good Old Time Music
 Square Dance With Calls
 Canadian Old Time Music

See also

Music of Canada
List of Canadian musicians

Further reading

References

External links
De Jarlis recordings and musical scores at Library and Archives Canada
Early Settlers sound recordings at Library and Archives Canada

1914 births
1975 deaths
Canadian Métis people
Canadian folk fiddlers
Canadian male violinists and fiddlers
Métis musicians
Musicians from Manitoba
London Records artists
20th-century Canadian violinists and fiddlers
20th-century Canadian male musicians